The Abhayamudrā "gesture of fearlessness" is a mudrā (gesture) that is the gesture of reassurance and safety, which dispels fear and accords divine protection and bliss in Buddhism and other Indian religions. The right hand is held upright, and the palm is facing outwards. This is one of the earliest mudrās found depicted on a number of Hindu, Buddhist, Jain and Sikh images.

The abhayamudrā (施無畏印) represents protection, peace, benevolence and the dispelling of fear. The Hindu god Nataraja is depicted with the second right hand making the Abhaya Mudra, bestowing protection from both evil and ignorance to those who follow the righteousness of dharma.  In Theravada Buddhism, it is usually made with the right hand raised to shoulder height, the arm bent and the palm facing outward with the fingers upright and joined and the left hand hanging down while standing. In Thailand and Laos, this mudra is associated with the Walking Buddha, often shown having both hands making a double abhayamudrā that is uniform.

The abhayamudrā was probably used before the onset of Buddhism as a symbol of good intentions proposing friendship when approaching strangers. In the art of Gandhara, it is present when showing the action of preaching. It was also used in China during the Northern Wei and Sui eras of the 4th and 7th centuries.

The gesture was used by Gautama Buddha to subdue the elephant when attacked by a drunk elephant set off by Devadatta (some says by Ajātasattu), as shown in several frescos and scripts. In Mahayana Buddhism, deities often paired it with another mudrā using the other hand.

References

Bibliography

External links

Mudras
Hindu symbols
Buddhist symbols
Jain symbols
Sikh symbols
Indian iconography